EWB may refer to:

 Earl Weaver Baseball, a computer game
 Education Without Borders (Canadian organization)
 Education Without Borders (Sudan)
 Engineers Without Borders
 European Western Balkans, a web portal
 New Bedford Regional Airport in Massachusetts, United States
 Exploding Wire Bridge a type of detonator